YeoJin (also known as LOOΠΔ & YeoJin or HaSeul & YeoJin) is the fourth single album from South Korean girl group Loona's pre-debut project. It was released on January 16, 2017, by Blockberry Creative and distributed by CJ E&M as the fourth of 12 albums. It introduces member YeoJin and contains three tracks, her solo and the main track, "Kiss Later", a duet between HeeJin and HyunJin (two previously released members) titled "My Sunday", and a duet between her and HaSeul titled "My Melody". Music Videos for each song were released once a day from January 16 to the 18.

Track listing
All lyrics written by GDLO and Shin Agnes (MonoTree), except where noted. All music composed by Kim Yoo-seok, Chu Dae-kwan, and GDLO (MonoTree), except where noted. All tracks arranged by Chu Dae-kwan and Kim Yoo-seok (MonoTree), except where noted.

Charts

References

2017 singles
Loona (group) albums
Single albums
Blockberry Creative singles